Bogdan Vasile Panait (born 12 April 1983) is a Romanian football player who plays as a defender for CSM Vaslui. In his career Panait played for various football clubs from Romania, among them: Petrolul Ploiești, FC Vaslui, Steaua București, Politehnica Iași, Dunărea Galați, Dunărea Călărași or Metaloglobus București, but he also played in Moldova for FC Tiraspol and in Cyprus for Aris Limassol or ASIL Lysi.

Career
Panait made his professional debut in 2001 at Petrolul Ploieşti and also played between 2003 and 2006 for FC Vaslui. Despite being a fullback, Panait has a great scoring appetite. In the 2005/2006 he scored four goals in 26 league appearances. He was part of Steaua București's UEFA Champions League 2006–07 squad during 2006. In winter 2006, a trade between Steaua București and FC Vaslui took place: Marius Croitoru to Steaua București in exchange for Panait at FC Vaslui and a sum of money. In winter 2009, he was loaned to CS Otopeni, but he failed to avoid relegation with his team. He returned in the summer at FC Vaslui, but he is still on the transfer list.
In August, he was loaned again to CS Otopeni, for a season. He returned in the 2010 summer, where he was released.

Club statistics

Career honours

FC Vaslui 
UEFA Intertoto Cup
Winner: 2008

References

External links
 
 
 

1983 births
Living people
Sportspeople from Ploiești
Romanian footballers
Association football defenders
Liga I players
Liga II players
FC Petrolul Ploiești players
FC Vaslui players
FC Steaua București players
CS Otopeni players
FC Politehnica Iași (2010) players
FCM Dunărea Galați players
AFC Unirea Slobozia players
FC Dunărea Călărași players
FK Csíkszereda Miercurea Ciuc players
FC Metaloglobus București players
CSM Slatina footballers
Moldovan Super Liga players
Cypriot Second Division players
FC Tiraspol players
Aris Limassol FC players
ASIL Lysi players
Romanian expatriate footballers
Romanian expatriate sportspeople in Moldova
Expatriate footballers in Moldova
Romanian expatriate sportspeople in Cyprus
Expatriate footballers in Cyprus